The women's sprint K-1 (kayak single) 500 metres competition at the 2018 Asian Games was held on 30 August 2018.

Schedule
All times are Western Indonesia Time (UTC+07:00)

Results

References

External links
Official website

Women's K-1 500 metres